British pop singer Joe McElderry has released five studio albums, twelve singles and ten music videos on recording labels Syco and Decca.

McElderry rose to fame after winning The X Factor and signing a million pound record deal with Simon Cowell's company Syco, His debut single "The Climb" debuted at number two selling over 450,000 copies in its first week of release. The following week, the single rose to the top of the charts and remains McElderry's only chart topper. After releasing his debut album Wide Awake, McElderry was dropped from Syco despite its number three chart placing. McElderry later signed a record deal with Decca after winning Popstar to Operastar.

On 19 August 2011 McElderry released Classic, which debuted at number two on the UK albums chart. On 28 November the same year, McElderry released his third studio album Classic Christmas, which debuted and peaked at number 15.

On 10 September 2012, McElderry released his fourth studio album Here's What I Believe. It debuted at number eight on the UK chart.

His 6th album Saturday Night at the Movies reached number ten on the UK charts in July 2017, becoming his fifth top 20 and fourth top-10 album.

Albums

Studio albums

Soundtracks

Box sets

Singles

As lead artist

As featured artist

Other charted songs

Other contributions

Music videos

Notes

References

Discographies of British artists